In mathematics, the Neville theta functions, named after Eric Harold Neville, are defined as follows:

 

 

 

 

Note that the functions  θp(z,m) are sometimes defined in terms of the nome q(m) and written θp(z,q) (e.g. NIST). The functions may also be written in terms of the τ parameter θp(z|τ) where .

Relationship to other functions

The Neville theta functions may be expressed in terms of the Jacobi theta functions

where .

The Neville theta functions are related to the Jacobi elliptic functions. If pq(u,m) is a Jacobi elliptic function (p and q are one of s,c,n,d), then

Examples

Symmetry

Complex 3D plots

Implementation
NetvilleThetaC[z,m], NevilleThetaD[z,m], NevilleThetaN[z,m], and NevilleThetaS[z,m] are built-in functions of Mathematica.

Notes

References

Special functions
Theta functions
Elliptic functions
Analytic functions